Pilibhit  Assembly constituency is  one of the 403 constituencies of the Uttar Pradesh Legislative Assembly,  India. It is a part of the Pilibhit district and  one of the five assembly constituencies in the Pilibhit Lok Sabha constituency. First election in this assembly constituency was held in 1957 after the "DPACO (1956)" (delimitation order) was passed in 1956. After the "Delimitation of Parliamentary and Assembly Constituencies Order" was passed in 2008, the constituency was assigned identification number 127.

Wards  / Areas
Extent  of Pilibhit Assembly constituency is KCs Nagar, Amaria, Jahanabad, Pilibhit  MB, Gularia Bhindara NP & Jahanabad NP of Pilibhit Tehsil.

Members of the Legislative Assembly

Election results

See also
Pilibhit Lok Sabha constituency
Pilibhit district
Sixteenth Legislative Assembly of Uttar Pradesh
Uttar Pradesh Legislative Assembly
Vidhan Bhawan

References

External links
 

Assembly constituencies of Uttar Pradesh
Pilibhit
Constituencies established in 1956